This is a list of the best-selling albums by year in the United States, published by American music magazine Billboard since 1956 as year-end rankings of album sales. Until 1991, the Billboard album chart was based on a survey of representative retail outlets that determined a ranking, not a tally of actual sales. Weekly surveys and year-end charts by Billboard and other publications such as now defunct Cash Box magazine sometimes differed. For instance, during the 1960s and 1970s, the number-one album as determined by these two publications differed in 10 out of 20 years. From 1992 onwards, the Billboard year-end and weekly charts were calculated by Nielsen SoundScan. Note that this slightly differs from prior Billboard year-end album charts, which were a measure of chart performances over twelve months from around December to November (cutoff determined by Billboard´s publication schedule) rather than actual total sales.

Harry Belafonte's Calypso (1956) was the first record to be recognized as a year's top-selling album by Billboard, when it started tracking sales figures. American singer-songwriter Taylor Swift is the first and only artist to have had six of their albums become best-selling records of their respective years. She accomplished it with Fearless (2009), 1989 (2014), Reputation (2017), Lover (2019), Folklore (2020), and Midnights (2022). American acts Mariah Carey, Whitney Houston, and Eminem, and British acts Elton John and Adele, have had two of their albums be the top-sellers in two separate years. American singer Michael Jackson's 1982 Thriller became the best-selling record in the country for two consecutive years in the 1980s. Other albums to achieve the same accomplishment included the My Fair Lady Original Cast Recording from the hit 1956 Broadway production between 1957 and 1958, the original soundtrack of West Side Story between 1962 and 1963, and Adele's 21 between 2011 and 2012.

1950s

1960s

1970s

1980s

1990s

2000s

2010s

2020s

Notes 

 Each year is linked to the article about music that year.
After Billboard began obtaining sales and airplay information from Nielsen SoundScan and Nielsen Broadcast Data Systems, the year-end charts are now calculated by a very straightforward cumulative total of yearlong sales points. This gives a more accurate picture of any given year's most popular titles, as an entry that hypothetically spent nine weeks at number one in March could possibly have earned fewer cumulative points than one spending six weeks at number three in January. Albums at the peak of their popularity at the time of the November/December chart-year cutoff many times end up ranked lower than expected on a year-end tally, yet are ranked on the following year's chart as well, as their cumulative points are split between the two chart years. Sometimes, the best-selling album of the year by Billboard is different than best-selling album of the year of Nielsen SoundScan, because Billboard calculates the year from December to November and Nielsen calculates the year from January to December.
In this list, from 1956 to 1991, the Billboard year-end tracking was used. From 1992 to date, Nielsen SoundScan's year-end tracking was used.
Since 2015, Billboard and MRC Data (formerly Nielsen SoundScan) used album-equivalent units to determine the year's top albums, thus there is a discrepancy between the best-selling album (based on pure sales) and the best-performing album (based on sales+streaming). For information regarding the best-selling albums in the MRC Data era (from 1991 to present), see List of best-selling albums in the United States of the Nielsen SoundScan era.

See also 

Best-selling albums in the United States since Nielsen SoundScan tracking began
Billboard Year-End
List of best-selling albums
List of best-selling albums in Argentina
List of best-selling albums in Australia
List of best-selling albums in Brazil
List of best-selling albums in Canada
List of best-selling albums in France
List of best-selling albums in Germany
List of best-selling albums in Japan
List of best-selling albums in the Philippines
List of best-selling albums in South Korea
List of best-selling albums in Taiwan
List of best-selling albums in the United Kingdom

References

External links
 Official website for Billboard magazine

American music by year
United States, by year
American music-related lists